Swimming at the 2017 Islamic Solidarity Games was held at the Aquatic Palace, Baku, Azerbaijan from 13 to 17 May 2017.

Medalists

Men

Women

Medal table

References

External links
Official website

2017 Islamic Solidarity Games
2017 in swimming
2017
Swimming in Azerbaijan